Archinemapogon erasella is a moth of the  family Tineidae. It is found in Venezuela as well as other countries in South America.

References

Moths described in 1863
Nemapogoninae